Clariallabes is a genus of airbreathing catfishes found in Africa.

Species
There are currently 16 recognized species in this genus:

 Clariallabes attemsi (Holly, 1927)
 Clariallabes brevibarbis Pellegrin, 1913
 Clariallabes centralis (Poll & J. G. Lambert, 1958)
 Clariallabes heterocephalus Poll, 1967
 Clariallabes laticeps (Steindachner, 1911)
 Clariallabes longicauda (Boulenger, 1902)
 Clariallabes manyangae (Boulenger, 1919)
 Clariallabes melas (Boulenger, 1887)
 Clariallabes mutsindoziensis Taverne & De Vos, 1998
 Clariallabes petricola Greenwood, 1956 (Victoria snake catfish)
 Clariallabes pietschmanni (Güntert, 1938)
 Clariallabes platyprosopos R. A. Jubb, 1965 (Broadhead catfish)
 Clariallabes simeonsi Poll, 1941
 Clariallabes teugelsi Ferraris, 2007
 Clariallabes uelensis (Poll, 1941)
 Clariallabes variabilis Pellegrin, 1926

References

 

Catfish genera
Freshwater fish genera
Taxa named by George Albert Boulenger
Taxonomy articles created by Polbot